Rattlin' Bones is the first collaboration album between the Australian country singer Kasey Chambers and the Australian singer Shane Nicholson, released by Liberation Music in Australia on 21 April 2008 (see 2008 in music).

Chambers said that co-writing was something she always wanted to do but never felt comfortable with until this record because there was no pressure in recording it. Nicholson said that "Writing was a product of our environment, something that happened in and around our daily lives. And something that getting to know the Chambers family has shown me is a beautiful way to make music." "We didn't want a duets album, where people come together for a vocal collaboration and go on their way. We wanted an album that sounds like a band with two singers in it. It feels that way to us. And we hope it feels that way to the people who hear it too." states Chambers again.

The album debuted at number-one on the Australian ARIA Albums Chart on 28 April 2008 with sales of 8,965 copies, knocking Apocalypso by The Presets off the top spot. The following week the album was knocked off the top spot by Madonna with her album Hard Candy, and fell to number four.

In October 2008, the album won Best Country Album at the 2008 ARIA Awards. In December 2008, the song "Rattlin' Bones" peaked on the ARIA Singles Charts at number 55.

Country Universe named Rattlin' Bones as the second-best country album of the decade.

Track listing

Charts

Weekly charts

Year-end charts

Certifications

References

2008 albums
ARIA Award-winning albums
Kasey Chambers albums
Shane Nicholson (singer) albums
Collaborative albums